Fitzcarraldo is a 1982 film by Werner Herzog.

Fitzcarraldo may also refer to:
Fitzcarraldo, 1982 soundtrack album to the Werner Herzog film
Fitzcarraldo (1995), second studio album by the Frames, an Irish rock band
 MV Fitzcarraldo, a cargo and passenger ship adapted into a touring performance venue by the theatre company Walk the Plank
Fitzcarraldo Editions, publisher

See also
 "Fatzcarraldo", 14th episode of season 28 of the animated television series The Simpsons
 Fitzcarrald District, a district of the Manú Province in Peru
 FitzGerald (disambiguation)